The Minister for Foreign Affairs is a cabinet minister in Papua New Guinea who is responsible for the Department of Foreign Affairs and Trade. In recent years, the Foreign Affairs portfolio has been increasingly tied to the Trade portfolio, and as such recent ministers are generally known as the Minister for Foreign Affairs and Trade.

List of foreign ministers of Papua New Guinea (1975–present)
 1975–1977: Sir Albert Maori Kiki
 1977–1980: Ebia Olewale
 1980............ Tony Ila
 1980–1982: Noel Levi
 1982–1984: Rabbie Namaliu
 1984–1985: John Giheno
 1985–1986: Legu Vagi
 1986–1987: Ted Diro
 1987............ Aruru Matiabe 
 1987............ Paias Wingti 
 1987–1988: Akoka Doi
 1988............ Paias Wingti
 1988–1992: Michael Somare 
 1992–1994: John Kaputin
 1994–1996: Sir Julius Chan
 1996–1997: Kilroy Genia
 1997............ Chris Haiveta
 1997–1999: Roy Yaki
 1999............ Sir Michael Somare
 1999–2000: Sir John Kaputin
 2000............ Sir Michael Somare
 2000–2001: Bart Philemon
 2001............ John Pundari
 2001–2002: John Waiko
 2002–2006: Sir Rabbie Namaliu
 2006............ Sir Michael Somare
 2006–2007: Paul Tiensten
 2007–2010: Sam Abal
 2010–2011: Don Polye
 2011–2012: Ano Pala 
 2011–2012: Paru Aihi 
 2012............ Sir Puka Temu
 2012–2019: Rimbink Pato
 2019............ Soroi Eoe
 2019–2020: Patrick Pruaitch
 2020–2022: Soroi Eoe
 2022-present: Justin Tkatchenko

Sources
 Rulers.org – Foreign ministers L–R

Foreign
Foreign Ministers
Politicians
Foreign Ministers of Papua New Guinea
Foreign Ministers